Events from the year 1993 in Belgium

Incumbents
Monarch: Baudouin (until 31 July); Albert II (from 9 August)
Prime Minister: Jean-Luc Dehaene

Events
January
 20 January – Kidnapping of Ulrika Bidegård

February
 6 February – Revision of the Constitution of Belgium signed into law

May
 15 May – Barbara Dex represents Belgium at the Eurovision Song Contest 1993

June
 6 June – Standard Liège wins the Belgian Cup at the Constant Vanden Stock Stadium

July
 31 July – Death of King Baudouin

August
 9 August – Albert II sworn in as monarch

Publications
 M. Leroy, De la Belgique unitaire à l'Etat fédéral (Brussels, Bruylant).

Births
 29 March – Thorgan Hazard, footballer
 13 April – Daan Myngheer, cyclist (died 2016)
 9 May – Rachel Sobry, politician
 13 May – Romelu Lukaku, footballer
 1 June – Noémie Happart, model
 4 September – Yannick Carrasco, footballer
 2 October – Michy Batshuayi, footballer

Deaths
 12 January – Pierre Nihant (born 1925), cyclist
 3 February
Éliane de Meuse (born 1899), painter
Karel Goeyvaerts (born 1923), composer
 23 February – Robert Triffin (born 1911), economist
 21 March – Albert Ramon (born 1920), cyclist
 10 July – Alfred Hamerlinck (born 1905), cyclist
 31 July – Baudouin of Belgium (born 1930), monarch
 21 September – Fernand Ledoux (born 1897), actor
 22 November – Alois De Hertog (born 1927), cyclist
 29 November – Arnold Boghaert (born 1920), bishop

References

 
Belgium
Years of the 20th century in Belgium
1990s in Belgium
Belgium